HMS Tremadoc Bay was a Bay-class anti-aircraft frigate of the British Royal Navy, named for Tremadoc Bay in north Wales.

The contract was changed in 1944, and the Bay-class ship was laid down on 31 August 1944, launched on 29 March 1945, and completed on 11 October 1945 after the end of hostilities.

Service history
After sea trials and weapons testing, Tremadoc Bay sailed on her first mission; towing a German Type XXI submarine to the Baltic Sea to be handed over to the Soviet Navy. The Tripartite Naval Agreement had agreed that all German U-boats would be sunk, apart from 30 that would be preserved and divided equally between the USSR, United Kingdom and United States for experimental and technical purposes. Unfortunately bad weather in the North Sea, and problems with the towing gear forced them to divert to Rosyth. She eventually sailed again on 7 December, arriving at Libau, Latvia, on the 14th, before sailing to Plymouth.

In February 1946 she towed the Type XXIII submarine , in company with the tug Bustler towing the Type XXI submarine , from Lisahally to Cherbourg for hand-over to the French Navy in "Operation Thankful". Once again towing problems in heavy weather forced her to take shelter, this time in Dublin Bay.

In March Tremadoc Bay was deployed for training and emergency duties with Plymouth Local Flotilla. In September 1947 she was deployed with sister ship  to the Mediterranean to escort the ships SS Ocean Vigour, SS Empire Rival and SS Runnymede Park  from Port-de-Bouc near Marseille to Gibraltar. These ships were transporting Jewish illegal immigrants, detained from  while attempting to enter Palestine, back to Europe.

Tremadoc Bay then resumed Local Flotilla duties at Plymouth, remaining there until April 1951, when she was decommissioned and put into Reserve at Devonport. She remained at Devonport until 1953 when she was refitted at Falmouth, then towed to Gibraltar still in Reserve. In 1958 she was placed on the Disposal List, in 1959, prior to being sold to an Italian shipbreaker, Tremadoc Bay made an appearance in the Film Silent Enemy, the film of Lt. Lionel Buster Crabb RNVR about the work defusing mines in Gibraltar during WW2, some time after this, she was taken under tow, and arrived at Genoa on 18 September for scrapping.

References

Publications
 
 Lenton, H.T., British and Empire Warships of the Second World War, Greenhill Books, 
 Marriott, Leo, Royal Navy Frigates 1945–1983, Ian Allan, 1983, 

 

1945 ships
Bay-class frigates
Ships built in Belfast
Ships built by Harland and Wolff